The Goodwill Games were an international sports competition created by Ted Turner in reaction to the political troubles surrounding the Olympic Games of the 1980s. In 1979, the Soviet invasion of Afghanistan caused the United States and other Western countries to boycott the 1980 Summer Olympics in Moscow, an act reciprocated when the Soviet Union and other Eastern Bloc countries (with the exception of Romania) boycotted the 1984 Summer Olympics in Los Angeles.

Like the Olympics, the Goodwill Games were held every four years (with the exception of the final Games), and had a summer and winter component. However, unlike the Olympics, figure skating, ice hockey and short track speed skating were part of summer editions. The Summer Goodwill Games occurred five times, between 1986 and 2001, while the Winter Goodwill Games occurred only once, in 2000. They were cancelled by Time Warner, which had bought ownership of them in 1996, because of low television ratings after the 2001 Games in Brisbane.

Overview
The first Goodwill Games, held in Moscow in 1986, featured 182 events and attracted over 3,000 athletes representing 79 countries. World records were set by Sergey Bubka (pole vault), Jackie Joyner-Kersee (heptathlon), and both the men and women's 200 m cycle racing, by East Germany's Michael Hübner and the Soviet Union's Erika Salumäe, respectively. World records also fell at the 1990 Games in Seattle, to Mike Barrowman in the 200 m breaststroke and Nadezhda Ryashkina in the 10 km walk.

The 1994 Games in Saint Petersburg, Russia were the first competition held since the dissolution of the Soviet Union. Russians set five world records in the weightlifting section, and the games were the first major international event to feature beach volleyball, which would appear at the Olympics for the first time at the 1996 Atlanta Games.

In October 1996, Turner's company, the Turner Broadcasting System, merged with Time Warner, thus bringing the Goodwill Games under the control of the latter. Ted Turner's last Games were in 1998 in New York City, with memorable highlights including Joyner-Kersee winning her fourth straight heptathlon title, the U.S. 4 × 400 m relay team setting a world's best time, plus Michelle Kwan and Todd Eldredge winning the gold in figure skating, and Dominique Moceanu capturing the women's gymnastics gold medal. Time Warner organized the 2001 Games in Brisbane, Australia, before announcing that this would be the last edition of the games. With the cancellation of the Games, Phoenix, Arizona and Calgary lost their respective Summer and Winter Games, scheduled for 2005. The 2001 edition witnessed Australia winning the most medals with 75, but it received very low television ratings in the United States. Nevertheless, critics praised Turner Network Television for showing the games live, rather than on tape delay.

During a live interview at the 2009 Denver SportAccord conference, Turner blamed the demise of the Games on the short-sighted management of Time Warner, and stated, "If I'd have stayed there the Goodwill Games would not have been canceled." Turner expressed hope that the games would return as a bridge to restore cultural contact between Russia and the U.S., stating that the relationship between the two had steadily disintegrated since the Cold War, which he called a dangerous situation because of both countries' massive nuclear arsenals. He also reiterated his belief in the power of international sporting competitions to prevent war, saying that "as long as the Olympics are taking place and not being boycotted, it's virtually impossible to have a world war", because the nations involved "wouldn't want a war to mess up their chances".

Summer Goodwill Games

 The 2001 Goodwill Games were the final edition

Winter Goodwill Games

Sports

Summer sports

Winter sports

 Alpine skiing
 Bobsleigh
 Cross-country skiing
 Figure skating

 Freestyle skiing
 Luge
 Nordic combined
 Skeleton

 Ski jumping
 Snowboarding
 Speed skating

Participating countries

Africa and Middle East
 Algeria
 Benin
 Burkina Faso
 Côte d'Ivoire
 Ethiopia
 Kenya
 Morocco
 Namibia
 Nigeria
 Senegal
 Seychelles
 Syria
 Tanzania
 Tunisia
 North Yemen – later as Yemen
 Zimbabwe

 Asia and Oceania
 Australia
 Bangladesh
 Cambodia
 China
 Japan
 North Korea
 South Korea
 Laos
 New Zealand
 Philippines
 American Samoa
 Taiwan (as Chinese Taipei)
 Vietnam

Europe
 Great Britain 
 Finland
 France
 Greece
 Ireland
 Italy
 Portugal
 Spain
 Sweden
 West Germany – later as Germany
 Yugoslavia

Eastern Bloc
 Belarus 
 Bulgaria
 Czechoslovakia – later as the Czech Republic
 Czechoslovakia – later as Slovakia
 East Germany – later as Reunified Germany
 Estonia
 Hungary
 Kazakhstan
 Latvia
 Lithuania
 Poland
 Romania
 Soviet Union – later as Russia
 Ukraine
 Uzbekistan

North America
 Canada
 Mexico
 United States

Caribbean and Central America
 Bahamas
 Costa Rica
 Cuba
 Jamaica
 Puerto Rico
 Trinidad and Tobago

South America
 Argentina
 Brazil
 Colombia
 Ecuador
 Peru
 Uruguay

See also
 Liberty Bell Classic
 Friendship Games

References

External links

 
Defunct multi-sport events
Recurring sporting events established in 1986
Recurring sporting events disestablished in 2001
Turner Sports
Soviet Union–United States relations
Russia–United States relations